Frank Henry Temple Bellew (April 18, 1828 – June 29, 1888), American artist, illustrator, and cartoonist.

Personal
Bellew was born in Sydney, India, in 1828, the son of Francis-John Bellew, a British officer, and Anne Smoult Temple, of Hylton Castle.

He was he father of Frank P.W. Bellew, who signed his work "Chip," as in "chip off the old block." Bellew Avenue Road in Parade locality of Kanpur is named after Frank.

Career
Bellew drew for most of the notable publications of his time, including Frank Leslie's Illustrated, Harper's Monthly, Harper's Weekly, Harper's Bazaar, St.Nicholas, and humor magazines such as The Lantern, The New York Picayune, Vanity Fair (US, 1859-1863), The Funniest of Phun, Wild Oats, Puck, Judge, and the comic Life.

Bellew came to New York from England in 1850 and worked in the city his entire career. In 1931 Time magazine credited Bellew with having drawn the first Uncle Sam for a cartoon in an 1852 issue of The Lantern. This claim was discredited by Alton Ketchum in his book Uncle Sam: The Man and the Legend (Hill and Wang, 1959), in which he traced the first depiction of Uncle Sam back to a cartoon in 1832.

Bellew's November 26, 1864, Harper's Weekly caricature of Abraham Lincoln, "Long Abraham Lincoln a Little Longer," exaggerating the height and thinness of the president to absurd extremes, was popular.

Friendships
Because his wife's family lived briefly in Concord, Massachusetts, Bellew knew and socialized with Ralph Waldo Emerson and Henry David Thoreau, who visited Bellew once at his studio on Broadway in New York City.

Thoreau and Bellew discussed philosophical matters, as Thoreau recorded in his Journals on October 19, 1855:

Talking with Bellew this evening about Fourierism and communities, I said that I suspected any enterprise in which two were engaged together.  "But," said he, "it is difficult to make a stick stand unless you slant two or more against it."  "Oh, no," answered I, "you may split its lower end into three, or drive it single into the ground, which is the best way; but most men, when they start on a new enterprise, not only figuratively, but really, pull up stakes.  When the sticks prop one another, none, or only one, stands erect."

Bibliography
Bellew, Frank.  The Art Of Amusing: A Collection Of Graceful Arts, Games, Tricks, Puzzles, and Charades.  New York: G.W. Carleton and Co., 1866.
Bellew, Frank.  A Bad Boy's First Reader.  New York: G.W. Carleton and Co., 1881. (NOTE: This is a reprint of That Comic Primer)
Bellew, Frank.  "Emerson and Walt Whitman," Lippincott's Magazine, June 24, 1884.
Bellew, Frank. Jeff Petticoats.  New York: Intagliotype and Graphotype Co., c. 1866.
Bellew, Frank, ed. Joe Miller's Jests With Copious Editions.  New York: Office of the Northern Magazine, 1865.
Bellew, Frank.  That Charming Evening: A Volume Intended To Amuse Everybody and Enable All To Amuse Everybody Else: Thus Bringing About As Near an Approximation To the Millennium As Can Be Conveniently Attained In the Compass Of One Small Volume.  New York: G.W. Carleton and Co., 1878. (NOTE: This is a reprint of The Art of Amusing)
Bellew, Frank.  That Comic Primer.  New York:  G.W. Carleton and Co., 1877.
Bellew, Frank, ed.  The Tramp: His Tricks, Tallies and Tell-tales, With All His Signs, Countersigns, Grips, Pass-words and Villainies Exposed.  New York: Dick & Fitzgerald, 1878.
Harte, F. Bret.  Illustrated by Frank Bellew.  Condensed Novels and Other Papers.  New York: G.W. Carleton, 1867. (The first book published by Bret Harte).
Smith, Kristen M., ed.  The Lines Are Drawn: Political Cartoons of the Civil War.  Athens, Georgia: Hill Street Press, c. 1999.

References

External links

 
 
Frank Bellew at Lambiek Comiclopedia – cartoon gallery includes "Long Lincoln", November 26, 1864, Harper's Weekly
Frank Bellew at The Vault at Pfaff's: An Archive of Art and Literature by the Bohemians of Antebellum New York (Lehigh.edu) with unconfirmed data on books illustrated
Frank Bellew at the New York Public Library Digital Gallery
Bellew cartoons from Harper's Weekly and other publications at HarpWeek.com
"Long Lincoln" notepad and pencil sold by the Lincoln Museum (lincolnmuseum.org)
Frank Bellew at Pressibus.org (French language)
"The American Frankenstein", New York Daily Graphic cartoon depicting the American railroad industry at a railroad history site
Search "Bellew" in the Prints & Photographs Online Catalog of the Library of Congress
"Tobacco and Its Users", Harper's New Monthly Magazine, March 1860 (archived 2006-03-30)
"The Situation On the Black Sea", 1877 Harper's Weekly cover at the Fine Arts Museum of San Francisco
Bellew cartoons at CartoonStock.com (commercial site)
Frank Bellew at The Billy Ireland Cartoon Library & Museum, Ohio State University
 

1828 births
1888 deaths
American caricaturists
American editorial cartoonists
People of the American Civil War
American satirists
People of New York (state) in the American Civil War
People from Kanpur
19th-century American journalists
American male journalists
19th-century American male writers